In the district of Chichester, a large rural area in the English county of West Sussex, there are more than 50 former churches, chapels and other places of worship that still stand but that are no longer in religious use. Many are in the ancient city of Chichester, the district's largest centre of population: many medieval and Victorian Anglican churches were built there to serve tiny parishes (sometimes covering only a few streets) that were later combined with others, and chapels serving various Nonconformist denominations were closed after their congregations declined. Elsewhere, in the villages and scattered farming communities that characterise the rest of the district, churches and chapels were superseded by new buildings, closed due to declining attendance or shifts in population, or rendered unusable because of structural problems. A few former places of worship are now ruinous but still survive in derelict or fragmentary form. Many others are fully usable and have been converted to new uses – residential, commercial, educational, social and others. Some former churches stand empty awaiting a new function.

A building is defined as "listed" when it is placed on a statutory register of buildings of "special architectural or historic interest" in accordance with the Planning (Listed Buildings and Conservation Areas) Act 1990. The Department for Culture, Media and Sport, a Government department, is responsible for this; English Heritage, a non-departmental public body, acts as an agency of the department to administer the process and advise the department on relevant issues. There are three grades of listing status: Grade I, the highest, is defined as being of "exceptional interest"; Grade II* is used for "particularly important buildings of more than special interest"; and Grade II, the lowest, is used for buildings of "special interest". As of February 2001, there were 80 buildings with Grade I status, 114 with Grade II* status and 3,057 with Grade II status in the district.

Overview of the district

The population in 2011 was 113,800. The ancient city of Chichester (originally a Roman town), with 23,731 residents at the time of the 2001 Census, is the largest settlement; the area is otherwise characterised by small towns, villages and hamlets. Only East Wittering, Midhurst, Selsey and Southbourne civil parishes have more than 3,000 people.

The city of Chichester has eight former Anglican churches, including six in the ancient city centre. St Olave's Church dates from the 11th century; the Churches of All Saints-in-the-Pallant and St Andrew-in-the-Oxmarket were built in the 13th century; and the Churches of St John the Evangelist, St Bartholomew and St Peter the Great all date from the 19th-century Anglican churchbuilding fervour that added hundreds of new buildings across England, not least in Sussex. Several other churches existed but have now gone, and there were eight ancient parishes; also, many of the churches were close together in the northeastern quarter of the city. This may account for both the small size of the ancient churches and the closure of many in the 20th century. Churches in the suburbs of Portfield and Rumboldswyke were declared redundant in 1981 and 1994 respectively. Portfield's is now a doll and mechanical musical instrument museum, and St Andrew-in-the-Oxmarket is an arts centre; St Olave's Church is a bookshop; Rumboldswyke and All Saints-in-the-Pallant have been converted into offices; St Peter the Great's Church has become a bar and restaurant; and the former Hornet Bible Christian Chapel is now a Chinese takeaway. Eastgate Hall, a Baptist place of worship from the 17th century until the mid-20th century, has had various secular uses including a restaurant, and is now a betting shop.

Elsewhere in the district, several other former Anglican parish churches are now closed for public worship. Examples are East Wittering, where the isolated 12th-century building was replaced with a modern church near the centre of population; Merston, where St Giles' Church was shut in 2010 because the roof was unsound; West Lavington, whose parish was united with that of Cocking when the church became too expensive for the small congregation to maintain; and Milland, where a new church was built alongside the old Tuxlith Chapel. Small settlements within larger parishes, including Bedham, Bexley Common, Henley Common and Rake, had their own mission churches (chapels of ease to the parish church) at various times during the 19th and 20th centuries but have now lost them.

Roman Catholicism has always had a strong following in West Sussex, and the two former churches of that denomination in the district both closed because they were replaced by larger buildings. At Midhurst the old church became a restaurant, and a barn served as a Mass Centre in Nutbourne until a permanent church was built at nearby Bosham. In contrast, various Protestant Nonconformist denominations that were strong in the 19th and early 20th centuries have declined, leading to the closure and sale of many chapels – often small, simple buildings in rural locations. The city of Chichester was a Presbyterian stronghold in the 18th century, supporting the Baffin's Hall chapel (now an auction gallery) from 1721. Calvinistic causes opened chapels catering for groups whose frequent splits and amalgamations led to the adoption of various denominational descriptions: chapels at Fernhurst, Midhurst and Petworth, all named Ebenezer, were used at various times by Strict Baptists, Particular Baptists, Independents and Gospel Standard Baptists, while a building with the same name in central Chichester passed from Independents to Congregationalists. The same happened at South Harting, where a meeting house (unusually built of clunch) that was provided for Independents in 1800 was ultimately superseded by a Congregational chapel, which survives in use, in 1871. Several Congregational chapels in other villages closed before the denomination united with the Presbyterian Church of England to form the United Reformed Church: Broadbridge, Cocking, Funtington and Wisborough Green all lost theirs. Even chapels that survived beyond the 1972 union were not immune from decline: Bosham Congregational Church, latterly Bosham United Reformed Church, held its final service in 2005. Methodism also experienced decline, and the gradual merger of several sub-groups (Bible Christians, Primitive Methodists, Wesleyans and others) to form the Methodist Church of Great Britain in 1932 reduced the number of chapels needed for worship. In West Sussex, just as in neighbouring counties, it proved popular to convert these buildings – sturdily built, often attractively designed and usually sold cheaply – into houses (as at Somerley, Sidlesham, Fernhurst, Walderton and West Wittering) or for commercial use, as evidenced by the former Bible Christian chapels in both Chichester and Nutbourne. The now-vanished Society of Dependants (also known as Cokelers), a small and obscure sect found in Surrey and Sussex, were based at Loxwood in Chichester district; their old chapel there is still in use by another congregation, but former Cokeler chapels in both Northchapel and Chichester have now fallen out of religious use.

Former places of worship

See also
Grade I listed buildings in West Sussex
List of current places of worship in Chichester (district)
List of demolished places of worship in West Sussex

Notes

References

Bibliography

Lists of churches in West Sussex
Lists of religious buildings and structures in England
Chichester District
Former religious buildings and structures in West Sussex